The Romani people in Turkey or Turks of Romani background are Turkish citizens and the biggest subgroup of the Turkish Roma. They are Sunni Muslims, mostly of the Sufi branch, who speak Turkish as their first language, in their own accent, and have adopted Turkish culture. Many have denied their Romani background over the centuries in order to establish a Turkish identity, to become more accepted by the host population. They identify themselves as Turks of Oghuz ancestry. More specifically, some have claimed to be members of the Yörüks, Amuca, Gajal or Tahtacı.

Since 1996, their official name in Turkey has been Romanlar and not Roma. They are also called Şopar (Gypsy kid) in Rumelian Romani dialect or Manuş (Human), and Çingene (Gypsy) in Turkish, while once in Ottoman Turkish they was named Cingân (Gypsy), Kıptî (Copts) and Mısırlı (Egyptians). As Gastarbeiter some Turkish Roma came to Germany and Austria and other European countries and fully assimilated in Turks in European communities.

There are officially about 500,000 Romani people in Turkey.

History
There are records of the presence of Romani people from AD 800 in Thrace, known in Greek as Athinganoi. At the time of the Rome–Constantinople schism of 1054, Athinganoi, settled Outside the Walls of Constantinople. Later in Ottoman time this quarter was named Sulukule, it is said, it was the oldest Roma settlement in Europe.

With the expansion of the Ottoman Empire, Turkish speaking Muslim Romani people settled in Rumelia (southeastern Europe) under Ottoman rule. 
The Ottoman Turkish Historian Evliya Çelebi explain  in his Seyahatnâme, that Mehmed the Conqueror in 1453, take Muslim Roma from Balat, Didim and former Menteşe (beylik), also the irreligious Roma from Gümülcine, and settled them in Istanbul, but both Groups didn't get along well, and some of the Gümülcine Groups went back. He also wrote, that the language of the Roma früm Gümülcine have Banyan merchants roots. The Ottoman Archives of the 18th century and 19th century told from 4 clans of the so-called Türkmen Kıpti, who speak Turkish only with few Romani words in there jargon and who are Alevis of Bektashi Order, as a separate group of other Roma people in Rumelia. They once migrated from Anatolia and settled finally in the Balkans and Crimea. Uniquely to Ottoman history, the Muslim Roma people were given their own Sanjak at the Kırklareli Province, by the order of Suleiman the Magnificent at 1530. Until today the Turkish Roma see Thrace as there Homeland.
The Turkish Historian Reşat Ekrem Koçu, explained that Muslim (Horahane), Eastern Orthodox (Dasikane) and Pagan Roma (Gadjikane) Groups lived in the Ottoman Empire. He also explained that the Christian Lom people who lived in Istanbul convert closed to Islam in the 19th century

Origin
The Romani people in Turkey are of very mixed Ancestry. According to their own oral tradition, (but it varies in some stories), their Ancestors once came from Hindustan The Early Romani originate from the Indian subcontinent, especially from Rohri in the Sukkur District of Sindh. The linguistic evidence has indisputably shown that the roots of the Romani language lie in Central India: The language has grammatical characteristics of Indian languages and shares with them a big part of the basic lexicon, for example, body parts or daily routines. More precisely, Romani shares the basic lexicon with Sanskrit and Prakrit. In February 2016, during the International Roma Conference, the Indian Minister of External Affairs stated that the people of the Roma community were "children of India". The conference ended with a recommendation to the Government of India to recognize the Roma community, spread across 30 countries, as a part of the Indian diaspora.

Genetic
Genetic findings in 2012 suggest the Early Romani originated in Indian subcontinent.,. Another genetic study shows that Turkish Roma are related to the Changar tribe from Pakistan of Punjab,. While the Early Romani people traces back to the Indian subcontinent, also Gene flow from the Ottoman Turks spilled over and established a higher frequency of the Y-haplogroups J and E3b in Balkan Roma Groups. The Greek Doctor A. G. Paspati made the statemant in his Book from 1860, that Turks married often Roma Woman, as example are the Basketmaker (Sepetçi) Sepečides Romani who is of Turkish/Greeks mixed Ancestry. Greeks and South Slavs DNA also influenced the Balkans Roma people. Also, the genetics of Peoples of the Caucasus influenced the Genetic impact of Roma people.

Migration to Turkey 
During the Population exchange between Greece and Turkey in 1923, different Muslim Roma groups from Greece, like the Sepetčides (Basketmakers) or the Tütünčides (Tobacco workers) moved to Turkey, and called Mübadil Romanlar. The Tobacco worker Roma from Greece, became active members in the Communist Party of Turkey (historical).

Turkish speaking Muslim Roma from Bulgaria, went from 1878 - 1989 in weaves to Turkey together with Turks and Pomaks.
Especially Turkish speaking pipe and drum band tribes, descendants of the Turcoman Gypsys went after Bulgarian Declaration of Independence to Istanbul.

In 1950-1951 Muslim Roma from Bulgaria came to Turkey and settled in Çanakkale and surroundings.

From 1953 -1968, Muslim Roma and Turks from Yugoslavia emigrated to Turkey,

Demographics
The majority of the Romani people in Turkey live in East Thrace, Marmara Region and Aegean Region. Cities with a high percentage of Romanlar are Edirne and Istanbul.

Culture
The Turkified Romani speak Turkish as there first language and assimilated fully in Turkish culture and are Cultural Muslims, based on Sunni Islam in the Hanafi school, and practise male Religious male circumcision, engagements and weddings on a grand scale. The burying foreskin after circumcision in a cemetery near or the Garden of a Mosque is a tradition amog the Muslim Roma. A foreskin is looked as unclean, and the Tradition of a Kirve, (Kirve is the godfather who pays for the celebrations), is taken by Alevism-Bektashism. The Roma bands and their special music in 9/8 beat and songs are particularly well known in Turkey. The majority deny their Romani origins and describe themselves as Turks and are proud to say How happy is the one who says I am a Turk. They see themselves as Turks and have the same cultural similarities with Turks, no similarities with Christian Roma from Europe. Belly dance, performed by women and men. In Edirne, they hold the Kakava festival every year.

Conservative romani groups are e.g. , the long-established Tekkekapılı, Kağıtçılar (Papermakers), the semi-nomadic Bandırmalı, (named after Bandırma, but their ancestors once came from Greece around 1923), who all live in Selamsız Romani-quarter in Üsküdar. The Kağıtçılar, in particular, have their own dialect that is not understood by other roma groups in their neighborhood.
Turkish-speaking Roma from Turkey distance themselves from other non-Turkish Roma groups, especially from Christian Roma, they call them Yabancı (foreigners). While Christian Roma regard them simple as Turks (term for Muslims), because they have no Romanipen.

Legal status
In modern Turkey, Muslim Romani do not have the legal status of an ethnic minority because they are traditionally adherents of the Islamic faith, adherents of which, regardless of ethnicity or race, are considered part of the ethnic majority in Turkey. This goes as far back as the Treaty of Lausanne (1923), in which Section III "Protection of Minorities" puts an emphasis on non-Muslim minorities.

In popular culture
A group of Turkish Romani appears in the 16th century Ottoman Constantinople of the video game Assassin's Creed: Revelations.

A Turkish TV series made between 2004 and 2007 called Cennet Mahallesi is based on Istanbulite Romans.

Sufism
Many Turkish Roma, are members of the Hindiler Tekkesi a Qadiriyya-Tariqa, founded in 1738 by the Indian Muslim Sheykh Seyfullah Efendi El Hindi in Selamsız.

Groups of Turkish Romanlar

Yerli and Çerge generic term 
The majority of the Romani people in Turkey live in Eastern Thrace, mostly in the Kırklareli Province, they are divided into two Main groups, the Sedentary Yerli and the Semi-Nomadic Çerge. There are several subgroups of both, named after their old professions which they once practiced or which they still do in part, as example: the Sepetçiler (Basketmaker's), Çiçekçi (Flower seller), Cambazı (Horse trader), Ayıcılar (Bear-leader's), Demirci (Blacksmith), Çiçekçi (Flower seller), Sünnetçi (Circumciser), Subaşı (Water carrier), Kuyumcu (Goldsmith), Kalaycı (Tinsmith), Şarkıcı (Singer), Müzisyen (Musician), Elekçiler (Sieve maker's), Bohçacı (Bundler), Arabacı (Coachman), Katırcıları (Muleteer's), etc. However, mostly all of the different Romani groups today are Working poor in a wide variety of jobs.
The Yerli and the Çerge, live together in the Mahalla, but they don't like each other. The Yerli speak only Turkish as their mother tongue, while the Çerge speak Turkish and Rumelian Romani. Although both groups are Muslims, the Yerli look down on the Çerge, and consider them savage, uncivilized and keep their distance from them. Interestingly, the Yerli call themselves Romanlar, while they call the Çerge Çingeneler''. The Yerli consider the Çerge to have once come from the Balkans to Eastern Thrace.

Sepetçi subgroup
Since Ottoman Empire, the Muslim basket weavers Romanlar were very respected alongside Roma musicians. Because those Romani people, who became Muslims after the conquest of Istanbul at 1453, set up the mehter band of the Ottoman military band and the best and richest basket makers of Istanbul came from Sulukule. The Basketmakers' Kiosk was also built in their honor, where the basket makers guild was based. 
In East Thrace, the European part of turkey, in the Kırklareli Province, they are the  Sepetçi Romanlar (Basket-weaver Roma), who are still doing their old job today and The Sepetçi Association was established in the Vize district of Kırklareli.
Also in In Keşan, a special cooperative was established by Sepetçi women. At Evreşe in Gelibolu they are a Group of Sepečides whose Nomad Ancestor's once came from Thessaloniki/Selanik in Greece, still weave Baskets. 
In other parts in Turkey, live descendants of the Sepečides, especially in İzmir, who once came from Thessaloniki/Selanik in Greece in 1923, some of them still speak Sepečides Romani but the majority speak Turkish.

Ayjides subgroup
The Ayjides or Ayıcı are former Bear-leader's who hold Tame bear's until the 1990s.

Romani Heritage
Through the World Romani Congress and contact with other Romani groups of different countries, the interest in their own Romani Heritage and Language awakened, by the Romanlar in Turkey. Only a view Romanlar in East Thrace use Sedentary Rumelian Romani dialect at Home together, also the Sepečides Romani language in Izmir are nearly lost.

Gallery

Notable Turkish people of Romani heritage 
Sibel Can, folk pop and classical music singer 
Didem, belly dancer, model and singer
Kibariye, Arabesque-pop singer 
Özcan Purçu, politician 
Hüsnü Şenlendirici, musician
Selim Sesler, clarinet virtuoso 
Ankaralı Turgut, musician
Rafet el Roman, Popstar

See also
 Minorities in Turkey
 Abdal of Turkey
 Muslim Roma
 Turkish Roma

References

External links

 Council of Europe, report about the Roma in Turkey
Roma - Minority Rights Group

Romani in Turkey